The Montenegro women's national handball team represents Montenegro in international handball competitions. The national team was formed in 2006 after the Montenegrin independence.

The team made their debut match in the November 2006. Except for qualifying matches, Montenegro played on World Championship, European Championship and Olympic Games.

The women's handball team is among most successful national teams of Montenegro. They won Montenegro's first ever Olympic medal in 2012 by reaching the final. The same year, Montenegro was a champion of Europe.

Honours 
Below are major achievements of Montenegro women's national handball team in international competitions.
Olympic Games:
Silver (2nd): 2012
European Championship:
Winners: 2012
Semifinalists: 2014

Tournaments

List of participation
During the past, Montenegro participated on the next official (EHF/IHF) tournaments:

Overall

Records 

Largest victory 42:15,  – , 7 December 2011, Santos

Largest defeat 23:34,  – , 20 December 2015, Herning

Longest unbeaten streak 9 matches, (14 June 2009 - 11 December 2010)

Longest losing streak 6 matches, (6 August 2016 - 6 December 2016)

Most scored goals in a match 42,  –  42:15,  –  26:42

Most goals against in a match 35,  –  40:35

Results
Below is the list of all official matches of Montenegro national handball team.

WCQ - World Championship qualifiers; ECQ - European Championship qualifiers; OGQ - Olympic Games qualifiers

Montenegro vs. other countries 
Below is the list of performances of Montenegro national handball team against every single opponent.

See also 
 Handball Federation of Montenegro

External links
Official website
IHF profile

Women's national handball teams
National team
Handball in Montenegro
Handball-related lists